Saveetha Institute of Medical And Technical Sciences is a private and deemed-to-be-university located in Chennai, Tamil Nadu, India. It has nine disciplines of studies: Dental College, School of Management, School of Law, School of Engineering, College of Liberal Arts and Sciences, School of Physiotherapy, School of Nursing and Medical College. The first three disciplines are in Poonamalle while the rest are in Thandalam. Saveetha Engineering College is an Anna University-affiliated institution. Admissions are done through Class 12th Indian board examinations.

History 
Saveetha Dental college was started in the year 1988 and in 2005 it was established as a deemed university and renamed as Saveetha Institute of Medical And Technical Sciences.

Campus facilities

Poonamallee campus 
The Poonamalle campus in Chennai consist of Dental College, School of Management, School of Law.

Thandalam Campus 
The Thandalam campus consist of School of Engineering, School of Physiotherapy, School of Nursing and Medical College, College of Liberal Arts and Sciences.

Rankings

The National Institutional Ranking Framework (NIRF) ranked Saveetha Institute of Medical And Technical Sciences 26 among universities in India in 2022 and 44 overall. In dental rankings it was ranked first in India.

Guinness record 
Saveetha medical college and hospital entered the GUINNESS BOOK OF WORLD RECORDS on 7 April 2016, for the award of

1.Most people in a CPR relay- 2619 people

2.Most people to complete CPR training in 24 hours- 28015 people

References

External links

Deemed universities in Tamil Nadu
Universities in Tamil Nadu
Universities and colleges in Kanchipuram district
Educational institutions established in 2005
2005 establishments in Tamil Nadu